William Thaddeus Coleman III (born 1947) is a United States lawyer who served as General Counsel of the Army during the Clinton administration.

Biography
Coleman was born in Boston on April 20, 1947, the son of William Thaddeus Coleman, Jr. and his wife Lovida.  He was educated at Williams College (B.A., 1970), and Yale Law School (J.D., 1973).  During his first year at law school, he was befriended by fellow law student Bill Clinton and the two were roommates during their second year of law school. After completing law school, he served as a clerk for federal District Judge Edward T. Gignoux.

Coleman was admitted to the bar of Georgia in 1974, and has practiced law since then, most recently in Philadelphia.  In the 1990s, when Bill Clinton became President of the United States, he appointed Coleman General Counsel of the Army.  Coleman was the subject of a minor scandal in 1997 when he was accused of sexual harassment.  An investigation into the allegations by the Office of the Inspector General, U.S. Department of Defense later concluded that, while Coleman had told some off-color jokes, he had not committed sexual harassment.

Coleman married his wife, Allegra Saenz Coleman, in 2003, and together the couple have two children: William Thaddeus Coleman IV and Amadeus Alexander-Browne Coleman. He also has four stepchildren.

References

1947 births
Living people
Williams College alumni
Yale Law School alumni
Lawyers from Boston
African-American lawyers
Georgia (U.S. state) lawyers
United States Army civilians
General Counsels of the United States Army
21st-century African-American people
20th-century African-American people